The list of shipwrecks in February 1830 includes ships sunk, foundered, grounded, or otherwise lost during February 1830.

1 February

2 February

3 February

6 February

7 February

8 February

9 February

10 February

12 February

13 February

16 February

21 February

22 February

23 February

24 February

25 February

28 February

Unknown date

References

1830-02